Amer Delić was the defending champion but decided not to participate.
Jan Hernych won the title, defeating Jan Mertl 6–3, 3–6, 7–6(7–5) in the final.

Seeds

Draw

Finals

Top half

Bottom half

References
 Main Draw
 Qualifying Draw

BH Telecom Indoors - Singles
2012 Singles